The Ford Aspire nameplate has been used by the American automobile manufacturer Ford for the following cars, in the following markets:

 Ford Festiva, in North America from 1993 to 1997
 The sedan version of the Ford Figo, a rebadged third generation Ford Ka in India since 2015

Aspire